Orange Park is a town in Clay County, Florida, United States. It is a suburb of Jacksonville, in neighboring Duval County. The population was 8,412 at the 2010 census. The name "Orange Park" is additionally applied to a wider area of northern Clay County outside the town limits, covering such communities as Fleming Island, Lakeside, Bellair-Meadowbrook Terrace and Oakleaf Plantation.

The town's name reflects the hope of its founders for a fruit-growing industry, but their crops were destroyed in the Great Freeze of 1894–1895. Despite recovery elsewhere, the crops never came back to Orange Park.

History 

Orange Park in the late 18th century was known simply as Laurel Grove. The name Laurel Grove comes from Sarah and William Pengree, who received a land grant from the Spanish governor. Laurel Grove was sold to Zephaniah Kingsley, of the Kingsley Plantation, upon William's death. Zephaniah developed Laurel Grove into a model farming plantation for over 10 years. In 1813, General Matthews invaded East Florida, triggering the Patriots' Rebellion. After Mathews left East Florida, Zephaniah's wife, Anna Madgigine Jai Kingsley, burned down Laurel Grove to keep it out of Patriots' hands.

The Town of Orange Park was founded, in 1877, by the Florida Winter Home and Improvement Company. After the Civil War, the company bought several thousand acres of the McIntosh plantation at Laurel Grove, for the purpose of creating a southern retreat and small farming community. The property was divided into building lots and small farm tracts, division that involved laying out the present street system, including Kingsley Avenue and Plainfield Avenue. The town was incorporated in 1879 by a special act of the Florida Legislature. In January 1880, Ulysses S. Grant and Philip Sheridan visited Orange Park. A large hotel was built at Kingsley Avenue along with a 1,200-foot pier. In 1895, the local fruit-growing industry was destroyed in the Great Freeze of 1895.

In October, 1891, the Orange Park Normal & Industrial School was opened. The school was founded by the American Missionary Association and allowed for both black and white students to attend, the only unsegragated school in Florida at the time. However, by the end of 1913, the school was closed due to Jim Crow laws.

In 1930, Robert Yerkes, with the support of Yale University, the Rockefeller Foundation, and the Carnegie Foundation, established a research station in Orange Park to study primate biology and behavior. Originally called the Yale Laboratories for Primate Biology, it was renamed the Yerkes Laboratory of Primate Biology after Yerkes retired in 1941. In 1956, ownership of the laboratory was transferred to Emory University. The laboratory became the Yerkes National Primate Research Center; it was moved to the Emory University campus in Georgia in 1965.

Geography 

Orange Park is in the northeast corner of Clay County, on the St. Johns River, at  (30.168569, –81.708479). Orange Park is a suburb of Jacksonville which borders it to the north. Greater Orange Park encompasses the unincorporated communities of Fleming Island, Ridgewood, Doctors Inlet, Orange Park South, Lakeside, and Bellair-Meadowbrook Terrace.

Orange Park Elementary School, built in 1927, continues to operate a few blocks from the river. It is near Moose Haven, in the River Road Historic District, a stretch of road parallel to the Saint Johns River and dotted with century-old trees, where many locals come to walk and jog in the afternoon. About a quarter of a mile away is Club Continental, previously called Mira Rio. Mira Rio, whose name was Spanish for "River Watch", was the winter palazzo of Caleb Johnson, son of the founder of the Palmolive Soap Company, now the billion-dollar Colgate-Palmolive company.

Many others are in the medical field.

Demographics

As of the census of 2010, there were 8,412 people, a 7.4% decline from 2000; there were 3,464 households, and 2,215 families residing in the town. The racial makeup of the town was 75.9% White, 14.8% African American, 0.3% Native American, 3.2% Asian, 0.1% Pacific Islander, 2.3% from other races, and 3.4% from two or more races. Hispanic or Latino of any race were 8.8% of the population. In addition, mirroring Jacksonville, the town has one of the highest percentage of Filipino Americans in the state of Florida.

There were 3,464 households, out of which 23.2% had children under the age of 18 living with them, 45.0% were married couples living together, 14.0% had a female householder with no husband present, and 36.1% were non-families. 30.6% of all households were made up of individuals, and 34.5% had someone living alone who was 65 years of age or older. The average household size was 2.33 and the average family size was 2.89.

In the town, the population was spread out, with 21.0% under the age of 18, 7.9% from 18 to 24, 24.8% from 25 to 44, 25.3% from 45 to 64, and 21.0% who were 65 years of age or older. The median age was 43 years. For every 100 females, there were 90.3 males. For every 100 females age 18 and over, there were 87.7 males.

The median income for a household in the town was $47,631, and the median income for a family was $58,093. Males had a median income of $36,590 versus $26,846 for females. The per capita income for the town was $24,087. About 4.6% of families and 7.5% of the population were below the poverty line, including 10.8% of those under age 18, 17.1% of those age 65 or over.

Education 

Orange Park is in the Clay County School District and has three public elementary schools, two public junior high schools, and three public high schools. Another ten public elementary schools, two public junior high schools, and three public high schools are outside the town limits. Orange Park also has several private schools. Fortis College, a for-profit two-year college is in Orange Park, as is a campus of St. Johns River State College.

Oakleaf High School is the second closest public high school, about two miles southwest of the town limits. Ridgeview High School is the third, about three miles south of the town limits.

Notable people
Kat Cole, former CEO of Cinnabon
Hank Garland, guitarist
Nassir Little, NBA player
Terrance Plummer, former NFL linebacker
Billy Powell, keyboardist of Lynyrd Skynyrd
Ronnie Van Zant and Steve Gaines are buried in Jacksonville Memory Gardens Cemetery in Orange Park.
Shaquille Quarterman, NFL linebacker for the Jacksonville Jaguars
Adrian White, NFL defensive back and former coach for the Buffalo Bills
Dez White, retired NFL wide receiver
Slim Whitman, singer
Dane Dunning, baseball player

References

External links

 Town of Orange Park official website
 Fortis College – Orange Park Location

Towns in Clay County, Florida
Populated places established in 1877
Towns in the Jacksonville metropolitan area
Towns in Florida
Populated places on the St. Johns River
1877 establishments in Florida